

Unreturned artworks

Modena

Salome Receiving The Head of Saint John by Guercino, Musée des Beaux Arts, Rennes
The Martyring of Saint Peter and Saint Paul by Francesco Camullo and Ludovico Carracci, Musée des Beaux Arts, Rennes
Jesus Lamented by the Virgin by Guercino, Musée des Beaux Arts, Rennes
The Vision by Guercino, Musée des Beaux Arts, Rennes
The dream of Jacob of Cigoli, Nancy, Musée des Beaux Arts
The Madonna with the Baby Jesus Giving Benediction by Guercino, Chambéry Musée d'Art et d'Histoire
The Madonna and the Baby Jesus and the Martyring of Saint Paul by Guercino, Toulouse, Musée des Augustines
The Glory of All-Saints by Guercino, Toulouse, Musée des Augustines
Saint Sebastian Tended by Irene by Francesco Cairo, Tours, Musée des Beaux Arts
Saint Francis of Assisi Receiving the Stigmata by Guercino, Magonza, Mittelrehinschers Landesmuseum
The Holy Family Contemplating the Baby Jesus Sleeping by Francesco Gessi, Clermont-Ferrand, Musée des Beaux-Arts
The Martyrdom of Saint Victoria by Giovanni Antonio Burrini, Compiègne, Musée National du Chateau
The Martyrdom of Saint Christopher by Leonello Spada, Epernay, Notre Dame
Joseph and His Wife of Putifarre by Leonello Spada, Lille, Musée des Beaux Arts
Rinaldo and Armida by Alessandro Tiarini, Lille, Palais des Beaux Arts
Saint Bernard of Siena Saving Carpi from an Enemy Army by Ludovico Carracci, Notre Dame Cathedral
Christ and the Adulteress by Giuseppe Porta, now at the Bordeaux Musee des Beaux-Arts
1,300 drawings from the Gallerie Estensi, now at the Bibliothéque Nationale of Paris

Mantua
Transfiguration of Christ by Rubens, Museum of Nancy
The Baptism of Christ by Rubens, made for the Church of the Jesuit Trinity of Mantua, now at the Royal Museum of Fine Arts Antwerp of Antwerp

Madonna della Vittoria by Andrea Mantegna, from Mantua's church of Santa Maria della Vittoria, now at the Louvre
Adoration of the Shepherds with Saint Longino and Saint John the Evangelist by Giulio Romano, from the Basilica of San Andrea of Mantua, now at the Louvre
Saint Anthony Tempted by the Devil by Paolo Veronese, from Mantua Cathedral, now at the museum of Caen

Lombardy
The Preaching at Jerusalem by Carpaccio, from the Pinacoteca di Brera in Lombardy, now at the Musee du Louvre
The Virgin Casio by Boltraffio, from the Pinacoteca di Brera in Lombardy, now at the Musee du Louvre
Saint Bernard and Saint Louis by Moretto da Brescia, from the Pinacoteca di Brera in Lombardy, now at the Musee du Louvre
Saint Bonaventue and Saint Anthony of Padua by Moretto da Brescia, from the Pinacoteca di Brera in Lombardy, now at the Musee du Louvre
Sacred Family with Elizabeth, Joachim, and John the Baptist by Marco d'Oggiono, from the Pinacoteca di Brera in Lombardy, now at the Musee du Louvre
Annunciation Triptych by Rogier van der Weyden, central panel at the Musee du Louvre, side compartments at the Galleria Sabauda
The Dropsy, by Gerard Dou, Musee du Louvre
The Adoration of the Magi by Defendente Ferrari, now at the Malibu Getty Museum
Madonna in Glory by Defendente Ferrari, lost
Virgin with Jesus and Saint John the Baptist by Lorenzo Sabatini, Musee du Louvre

Tuscany

Fiesole
Coronation of the Virgin by Beato Angelico taken from the Convent of San Domenico in Fiesole, now at the Louvre
Virgin with Child and Saint Dominic and Thomas Aquinas, by Beato Angelico, taken from the Convent of San Domenico in Fiesole, Hermitage Museum
Crucifixion with the Torments and Saint Dominic, by Beato Angelico, taken from the Convent of San Domenico in Fiesole, Musee du Louvre

Florence
The Virgin, Jesus, and Saint Bernard by Cosimo Rosselli, from Florence
The Virgin, Jesus, Saint Giuliano, and Saint Niccolo by Lorenzo di Credi, from Florence
Virgin Embracing the Child, with Saint and Angels by Empoli, from Accademia delle Belle Arti di Firenze in Florence
Saint John the Baptist and Two monks by Andrea del Castagno, from Accademia delle Belle Arti di Firenze in Florence
The Virgin with Baby Jesus and Four Angels by Sandro Botticelli, from Accademia delle Belle Arti di Firenze in Florence
Jesus Appearing to Mary Magdalene by Angelo Bronzino, from the Santo Spirito in Florence
Bearing the Cross by Benedetto Ghirlandaio from the Santo Spirito in Florence
The Coronation of the Virgin and Four Saints by Raffaellino del Garbo, Florence
Coronation of the Virgin by Piero di Cosimo, Florence
Virgin Embracing the Child and Two Saints by Mariotto Albertinelli, Florence
Life of Christ by Taddeo Gaddi, Florence
Saint Francis and The Miracle of Dying by Pesello Peselli, Florence
Coronation of the Virgin by Ridolfo Ghirlandaio, Florence
Coronation of the Virgin and Two Angels by Simone Memmi, Florence
The Visitation by Domenico Ghirlandaio, from the church of Santa Maria Maddalena dei Pazzi in Florence, now at the Louvre
Virgin and Child with Saint Anne and Four Saints by Jacopo da Pontormo, from the church of Sant' Anna sul Prato of Florence, now at the Louvre
 by Gentile da Fabriano, from the Accademia di Belle Arti di Firenze, now at the Louvre
Barbadori Altarpiece by Fra Filippo Lippi, from the Santo Spirito of Florence, now at the Louvre

Pisa
The Sacrifice of Abraham by Sodoma, from Pisa
The Virgin Crowned by Jesus and Other Saints panel painting by Cenobio Machiavelli, from the Convent of Santa Croce in Fossabanda in Pisa
Virgin and Child sculpture by Giovanni Pisano, from Pisa
The Death of Saint Bernard by Orcagna, from Pisa
Saint Benedict by Andrea del Castagno, from Pisa
Saint Francis Receiving the Stigmata by Giotto, originally from the Pisan church of Saint Francis, now at the Louvre
Maesta by Cimabue, originally in the Pisan church of Saint Francis, now at the Louvre
Holy Mary with Her Divine Son Amid the Angels by Turino Vanni, from the Convent of San Silvestro in Pisa, now at the Louvre
Saint Thomas Aquinas with the Doctors of the Church by Benozzo Gozzoli, from the Duomo of Pisa, now at the Louvre
Holy Mary with Her Divine Son by Taddeo di Bartolo, from the San Paolo all'Orto, now at Musee du Grenoble

Parma, Piacenza, and Guastalla
The Immaculate Conception with St. Anselm and St. Martin by Giuseppe Maria Crespi, from Parma
 by Cima da Conegliano, now at the Louvre

Naples
The Adoration of the Magi by Spagnoletto, Musee du Louvre
The Sacred Family by Bartolomeo Schedoni, Musee du Louvre
The Virgin with the Baby Jesus by Cimabue, Museum of Lille
Saint Luke and the Virgin by Giordano, Musee de Lyon
Death of Sofonisba by Calabrese, Musee de Lyon
The Visitation by Sabbatini, Montpellier
Venus and Adonis by Vaccaro, Musee d'Aix-en-Provence
 by Piero di Cosimo, now at the Louvre

Rome and the Papal State

Equestrian Portrait of the Spanish Ambassador by Van Dyck, from the Palazzo Braschi, Musee du Louvre
Seated Man at the Foot of a Tree by Viruly, from the Palazzo Braschi, Musee du Louvre
The Usurers Thrown Out of the Temple by Braschi, from the Palazzo Braschi, Musee du Louvre
The Virgin, Jesus, and Saint John the Baptist by Giulio Romano, from the Palazzo Braschi, Musee du Louvre
Saint Francis by Albani, from the Palazzo Braschi, Musee du Louvre
Virgin and Jesus by Fasolo, from the Palazzo Braschi, Musee du Louvre
The Virgin of Loreto, copy of Raphael, from the Palazzo Braschi, Musee du Louvre
Dinner of Emmaus by Bernardo Strozzi, from the Palazzo Braschi, Musee de Grenoble
Saint Sebastian by Orbetto, from the Palazzo Braschi, Musee de Bordeaux
Pietà with Saint Francis and Saint Mary Magdalene by Annibale Carracci, from the church of Saint Francis of Ripa, Musee du Louvre
Salvator Mundi by Carlo Dolci, from the Villa Albani, Musee du Louvre
Virgin and Jesus by Fasolo, from the Villa Albani, Musee du Louvre
Virgin and Jesus by Vannucci, from the Villa Albani, Musee du Louvre
Resurrection of Lazarus by Bonifacio Veronese, Musee du Louvre

Umbria
Marriage of the Virgin by Perugino, Caen, now at the Musee des Beaux-Arts
San Pietro Polyptych by Perugino, now at the Lione Musee des Beaux-Arts

Veneto and Venezia
The Wedding at Cana of Veronese, taken from a Benedictine refectory in Venice, now at the Louvre
Agony in the Garden by Andrea Mantegna, originally in Verona's San Zeno, now at the Tours' Musee des Beaux-Arts
Resurrection by Andrea Mantegna, from Verona, now at the Tours' Musee des Beaux-Arts
The Crucifixion of Andrea Mantegna, originally from Verona's San Zeno, now at the Louvre

Other locations

The Codex Atlanticus of Leonardo da Vinci, 44 folios, and 196 other ancillary drawings, originally stored at the Biblioteca Ambrosiana, now stored at the Bibliotheque Nationale in Paris and the Musee des Beaux-Arts, Nantes
The Nativity by Filippo Lippo, from the convent of Santa Margherita of Prato, now at the Louvre
Christ Adored by the Angels, with Saint Bernard and Saint Sebastian by Carlo Bononi, now at the Louvre
The Virgin Appearing to Saint Catherine and Saint Luke by Annibale Carracci, commissioned for the Cathedral of Reggio Emilia, now at the Louvre
The Purification of the Virgin by Guido Reni, now at the Louvre
The Return of the Prodigal Son by Leonello Spada, now at the Louvre
The Patron Saints of the City of Modena by Guercino, now at the Louvre
Saint Paul by Guercino, now at the Louvre
The Triumph of Job by Guido Reni
Christ Mocked and Crowned with Thorns by Giambologna, now at the Bordeaux Musee des Beaux-Arts
The Madonna with the Baby Jesus Giving Benediction by Guercino, now at the Chambéry Musée d'Art et d'Histoire
The Holy Family Contemplating the Baby Jesus Sleeping by Francesco Gessi, now at the Clérmond-Ferrand Musée des Beaux-Arts
The Martyrdom of Saint Victoria by Giovanni Antonio Burrini, now at the Compiégne Musée National du Chateau
Joseph and The Wife of Putifarre by Leonello Spada, Lille Musee des Beaux Arts
Rinaldo Prevents Armada from Killing Herself by Alessandro Tiarini, Lille Musee des Beaux Arts
Saint Bernard of Siena Saves Carpi from an Enemy Army by Ludovico Carracci, Notre-Dame de Paris

Spain
The Birth of the Virgin by Murillo, from Seville Cathedral, now at the Louvre
Philip IV in Brown and Silver by Velázquez, from El Escorial, now at the National Gallery, London
Arnolfini Portrait by Jan van Eyck, from the Royal Palace of Madrid, now at the National Gallery, London
Madonna della tenda by Raphael, from El Escorial, now at the Alte Pinakothek, Munich

Repatriated artworks

Italy

Belvedere Apollo
Capitoline Venus
Venus Italica
The Laocoon group
Head of Jove
Horses of Saint Mark
Venus de' Medici

The sarcophagus slab of 
Transfiguration of Raphael
Portrait of Tommaso Inghirami by Raphael
Portrait of Leo X by Raphael
Madonna della seggiola by Raphael
Ecstasy of Saint Cecilia by Raphael
Portrait of the Cardinal Bibbiena by Raphael
Visitation by Raphael

Saint John the Baptist with the Saints Francesco Giralamo, Sebastian, and Anthony of Padua by Perugino
Crucifixion of Saint Peter by Guido Reni
Massacre of the Innocents by Guido Reni
Fortune with a Crown by Guido Reni
Madonna with the Long Neck by Parmigianino
Lamentation over the Dead Christ by Correggio
The Cathedral of Saint Peter by Guercino
 by Giulio Cesare Procaccini
 by Giuseppe Maria Crespi
 by Bartolomeo Schedoni
Ecce Homo by Ludovico Cigoli
Bringing Christ to the Tomb by Cavalier D'Arpino
Lamentation of the Dead Christ with the Saints Francis, Claire, John the Evangelist, Marie Magdalene, and Angels by Annibale Carracci
Mars and Venus by Antonio Canova
Madonna with Child and Saint Christopher and Saint George by Defendente Ferrari, returned to the Caselle Torinese
Young Dutch Woman at a Window by Gerard Dou, returned to the Galleria Sabauda
Deposition from the Cross by Federico Barocci

Austrian Empire
The Peasant and the Nest Robber by Peter Brueghel the Elder
The Peasant Dance by Brueghel the Elder
Triptych of Saint Sebastian by Christoph Amberger
Charity by Hans Baldung

Spain
Immaculate Conception by Murillo. Taken in 1813 and exchanged in 1941 for Velázquez's Portrait of Mariana of Austria

Others nations
The Battle of Alexander by Albrecht Altdorfer, Monaco

References

Art crime
Looting in Europe
Art and cultural repatriation
French Revolutionary Wars
Cultural heritage of Europe
Arts-related lists